Deliberative democracy or discursive democracy  is a form of democracy in which deliberation is central to decision-making. It adopts elements of both consensus decision-making and majority rule.  Deliberative democracy differs from traditional democratic theory in that authentic deliberation, not mere voting, is the primary source of legitimacy for the law. Deliberative democracy is closely related to consultative democracy, in which public consultation with citizens is central to democratic processes. 

While deliberative democracy is generally seen as some form of an amalgam of representative democracy and direct democracy, the actual relationship is usually open to dispute. Some practitioners and theorists use the term to encompass representative bodies whose members authentically and practically deliberate on legislation without unequal distributions of power, while others use the term exclusively to refer to decision-making directly by lay citizens, as in direct democracy.

The term "deliberative democracy" was originally coined by Joseph M. Bessette in his 1980 work Deliberative Democracy: The Majority Principle in Republican Government.

Overview
Deliberative democracy holds that, for a democratic decision to be legitimate, it must be preceded by authentic deliberation, not merely the aggregation of preferences that occurs in voting. Authentic deliberation is deliberation among decision-makers that is free from distortions of unequal political power, such as power a decision-maker obtained through economic wealth or the support of interest groups. If the decision-makers cannot reach consensus after authentically deliberating on a proposal, then they vote on the proposal using a form of majority rule.

The roots of deliberative democracy can be traced back to Aristotle and his notion of politics; however, the German philosopher Jürgen Habermas' work on communicative rationality and the public sphere is often identified as a major work in this area.

Deliberative democracy can be practiced by decision-makers in both representative democracies and direct democracies. In elitist deliberative democracy, principles of deliberative democracy apply to elite societal decision-making bodies, such as legislatures and courts; in populist deliberative democracy, principles of deliberative democracy apply to groups of lay citizens who are empowered to make decisions. One purpose of populist deliberative democracy can be to use deliberation among a group of lay citizens to distill a more authentic public opinion about societal issues but not directly create binding law; devices such as the deliberative opinion poll have been designed to achieve this goal. Another purpose of populist deliberative democracy can be to serve as a form of direct democracy, where deliberation among a group of lay citizens forms a "public will" and directly creates binding law. If political decisions are made by deliberation but not by the people themselves or their elected representatives, then there is no democratic element; this deliberative process is called elite deliberation. According to Fishkin, this process attempts to indirectly filter the mass public opinion because representatives are better equipped with the knowledge of the common good than ordinary citizens.

Characteristics

Fishkin's model of deliberation
James Fishkin, who has designed practical implementations of deliberative democracy for over 15 years in various countries, describes five characteristics essential for legitimate deliberation:
Information: The extent to which participants are given access to reasonably accurate information that they believe to be relevant to the issue
 Substantive balance: The extent to which arguments offered by one side or from one perspective are answered by considerations offered by those who hold other perspectives
 Diversity: The extent to which the major position in the public are represented by participants in the discussion
 Conscientiousness: The extent to which participants sincerely weigh the merits of the arguments
 Equal consideration: The extent to which arguments offered by all participants are considered on the merits regardless of which participants offer them
In Fishkin's definition of deliberative democracy, lay citizens must participate in the decision-making process, thus making it a subtype of direct democracy.

James Fishkin and Robert Luskin suggest that deliberative discussion should be:
 Informed (and thus informative). Arguments should be supported by appropriate and reasonably accurate factual claims.
 Balanced. Arguments should be met by contrary arguments.
 Conscientious. The participants should be willing to talk and listen, with civility and respect.
 Substantive. Arguments should be considered sincerely on their merits, not on how they are made or by who is making them.
 Comprehensive. All points of view held by significant portions of the population should receive attention.

Cohen's outline

Joshua Cohen, a student of John Rawls, outlined conditions that he thinks constitute the root principles of the theory of deliberative democracy, in the article "Deliberation and Democratic Legitimacy" in the 1989 book The Good Polity.  He outlines five main features of deliberative democracy, which include:

 An ongoing independent association with expected continuation.
 The citizens in the democracy structure their institutions such that deliberation is the deciding factor in the creation of the institutions and the institutions allow deliberation to continue.
 A commitment to the respect of a pluralism of values and aims within the polity.
 The citizens consider deliberative procedure as the source of legitimacy, and prefer the causal history of legitimation for each law to be transparent and easily traceable to the deliberative process.
 Each member recognizes and respects other members' deliberative capacity.
This can be construed as the idea that in the legislative process, we "owe" one another reasons for our proposals.

Cohen presents deliberative democracy as more than a theory of legitimacy, and forms a body of substantive rights around it based on achieving "ideal deliberation":
 It is free in two ways:
 The participants consider themselves bound solely by the results and preconditions of the deliberation.  They are free from any authority of prior norms or requirements.
 The participants suppose that they can act on the decision made; the deliberative process is a sufficient reason to comply with the decision reached.
 Parties to deliberation are required to state reasons for their proposals, and proposals are accepted or rejected based on the reasons given, as the content of the very deliberation taking place.
 Participants are equal in two ways:
 Formal: anyone can put forth proposals, criticize, and support measures.  There is no substantive hierarchy.
 Substantive: The participants are not limited or bound by certain distributions of power, resources, or pre-existing norms. "The participants…do not regard themselves as bound by the existing system of rights, except insofar as that system establishes the framework of free deliberation among equals."
 Deliberation aims at a rationally motivated consensus: it aims to find reasons acceptable to all who are committed to such a system of decision-making.  When consensus or something near enough is not possible, majoritarian decision making is used.

In Democracy and Liberty, an essay published in 1998, Cohen reiterated many of these points, also emphasizing the concept of "reasonable pluralism" – the acceptance of different, incompatible worldviews and the importance of good faith deliberative efforts to ensure that as far as possible the holders of these views can live together on terms acceptable to all.

Gutmann and Thompson's model
Amy Gutmann and Dennis F. Thompson's definition captures the elements that are found in most conceptions of deliberative democracy. They define it as "a form of government in which free and equal citizens and their representatives justify decisions in a process in which they give one another reasons that are mutually acceptable and generally accessible, with the aim of reaching decisions that are binding on all at present but open to challenge in the future".

They state that deliberative democracy has four requirements, which refer to the kind of reasons that citizens and their representatives are expected to give to one another:
 Reciprocal. The reasons should be acceptable to free and equal persons seeking fair terms of cooperation. 
 Accessible. The reasons must be given in public and the content must be understandable to the relevant audience.
 Binding. The reason-giving process leads to a decision or law that is enforced for some period of time.  The participants do not deliberate just for the sake of deliberation or for individual enlightenment. 
 Dynamic or Provisional. The participants must keep open the possibility of changing their minds, and continuing a reason-giving dialogue that can challenge previous decisions and laws.

Strengths and weaknesses
A claimed strength of deliberative democratic models is that they are more easily able to incorporate scientific opinion and base policy on outputs of ongoing research, because:
Time is given for all participants to understand and discuss the science
Scientific peer review, adversarial presentation of competing arguments, refereed journals, even betting markets, are also deliberative processes.
The technology used to record dissent and document opinions opposed to the majority is also useful to notarize bets, predictions and claims.

Deliberative ideals often include "face-to-face discussion, the implementation of good public policy, decisionmaking competence, and critical mass." According to proponents such as James Fearon, another strength of deliberative democratic models is that they tend, more than any other model, to generate ideal conditions of impartiality, rationality and knowledge of the relevant facts. The more these conditions are fulfilled, the greater the likelihood that the decisions reached are morally correct. Deliberative democracy takes on the role of an "epistemic democracy" in this way, as it thus has an epistemic value: it allows participants to deduce what is morally correct. This view has been prominently held by Carlos Nino.

Studies by James Fishkin and others have found that deliberative democracy tends to produce outcomes which are superior to those in other forms of democracy. Deliberative democracy produces less partisanship and more sympathy with opposing views; more respect for evidence-based reasoning rather than opinion; a greater commitment to the decisions taken by those involved; and a greater chance for widely shared consensus to emerge, thus promoting social cohesion between people from different backgrounds. Fishkin cites extensive empirical support for the increase in public spiritedness that is often caused by participation in deliberation, and says theoretical support can be traced back to foundational democratic thinkers such as John Stuart Mill  and Alexis de Tocqueville. Former diplomat Carne Ross writes that in 2011 that the debates arising from deliberative democracy are also much more civil, collaborative, and evidence-based than the debates in traditional town hall meetings or in internet forums. For Ross, the key reason for this is that in deliberative democracy citizens are empowered by knowledge that their debates will have a measurable impact on society.

Efforts to promote public participation have been widely critiqued. There is particular concern regarding the potential capture of the public into the sphere of influence of governance stakeholders, leaving communities frustrated by public participation initiatives, marginalized and ignored.

A claimed failure of most theories of deliberative democracy is that they do not address the problems of voting. James Fishkin's 1991 work, "Democracy and Deliberation", introduced a way to apply the theory of deliberative democracy to real-world decision making, by way of what he calls the deliberative opinion poll. In the deliberative opinion poll, a statistically representative sample of the nation or a community is gathered to discuss an issue in conditions that further deliberation. The group is then polled, and the results of the poll and the actual deliberation can be used both as a recommending force and in certain circumstances, to replace a vote. Dozens of deliberative opinion polls have been conducted across the United States since his book was published.

The political philosopher Charles Blattberg has criticized deliberative democracy on four grounds: (i) the rules for deliberation that deliberative theorists affirm interfere with, rather than facilitate, good practical reasoning; (ii) deliberative democracy is ideologically biased in favor of liberalism as well as republican over parliamentary democratic systems; (iii) deliberative democrats assert a too-sharp division between just and rational deliberation on the one hand and self-interested and coercive bargaining or negotiation on the other; and (iv) deliberative democrats encourage an adversarial relationship between state and society, one that undermines solidarity between citizens.

A criticism of deliberation is that potentially it allows those most skilled in rhetoric to sway the decision in their favour. This criticism has been made since deliberative democracy first arose in Ancient Athens.

The agonistic perspective on deliberative democracy
Deliberative theories of democracy have often been contrasted with agonistic models of democracy. Theorists of agonism such as Chantal Mouffe, Ernesto Laclau, and William E. Connolly, reject the possibility of reaching consensus through deliberation. In particular, Mouffe questions the empirical attainability of consensus in post-Cold War democracies.

Firstly, the consensus on the superiority of neoliberalism – which was believed to have been forged with the collapse of the USSR and the delegitimisation of communism as an ideological antidote to capitalism – is no longer as strong as it was in the wake of the dissolution of the USSR. Realising the failures of neoliberalism, such as massive economic inequality and the exploitations arising from capitalist practices, there is greater division on the issue of how best to organise societies globally today. Secondly, with the rise of identity politics in the West, people are less reliant on traditional parties for political representation, often believing that they have lost their ability to take their interests into account.

Together, agonistic theorists question whether consensus as a democratic approach is even appropriate because of its inability to embrace difference. To them, difference is an inerradicable condition of human existence; to pursue consensus is to assimilate identities into a universal category of neoliberal subjectivity, which can lead to various forms of coercion and exclusion. Accordingly, the lack of closure in politics, the "ongoing confrontation," is to be seen not as a sign of failure but a testament to the vibrancy of democracies.

Some academics do not think a clear-cut opposition between deliberative and agonistic theories can be identified. For example, drawing on the work of Hannah Arendt, Shmuel Lederman laments the fact that "deliberation and agonism have become almost two different schools of thought" that are discussed as "mutually exclusive conceptions of politics". Similarly, Giuseppe Ballacci argue that agonism and deliberation are not only compatible but mutually dependent: "a properly understood agonism requires the use of deliberative skills but also that even a strongly deliberative politics could not be completely exempt from some of the consequences of agonism".

History
Consensus-based decision making similar to deliberative democracy is characteristic of the hunter-gatherer band societies thought to predominate in pre-historical times. As some of these societies became more complex with developments like division of labour, community-based decision making was displaced by various forms of authoritarian rule. The first example of democracy arose in Greece as Athenian democracy during the sixth century BC. Athenian democracy was both deliberative and largely direct: some decisions were made by representatives but most were made by "the people" directly. Athenian democracy came to an end in 322BC. When democracy was revived as a political system about 2000 years later, decisions were made by representatives rather than directly by the people. In a sense, this revived version was deliberative from its beginnings; for example, in 1774 Edmund Burke made a famous speech where he called Great Britain's parliament a deliberative assembly. Similarly, the Founding Fathers of the United States considered deliberation an essential part of the government they created in the late 18th century.

The deliberative element of democracy was not widely studied by academics until the late 20th century. Although some of the seminal work was done in the 1970s and 80s, it was only in 1990 that deliberative democracy began to attract substantial attention from political scientists. According to Professor John Dryzek, early work on deliberative democracy was part of efforts to develop a theory of democratic legitimacy. Theorists such as Carne Ross advocate deliberative democracy as a complete alternative to representative democracy. The more common view, held by contributors such as James Fishkin, is that direct deliberative democracy can be complementary to traditional representative democracy. Since 1994, hundreds of implementations of direct deliberative democracy have taken place throughout the world. For example, lay citizens have used deliberative democracy to determine local budget allocations in various cities and to undertake major public projects, such as the rebuilding of New Orleans after Hurricane Katrina.

Association with political movements

Deliberative democracy recognizes a conflict of interest between the citizen participating, those affected or victimized by the process being undertaken, and the group-entity that organizes the decision.  Thus it usually involves an extensive outreach effort to include marginalized, isolated, ignored groups in decisions, and to extensively document dissent, grounds for dissent, and future predictions of consequences of actions.  It focuses as much on the process as the results.  In this form it is a complete theory of civics.

On the other hand, many practitioners of deliberative democracy attempt to be as neutral and open-ended as possible, inviting (or even randomly selecting) people who represent a wide range of views and providing them with balanced materials to guide their discussions. Examples include National Issues Forums, Choices for the 21st Century, study circles, deliberative opinion polls, the Citizens' Initiative Review, and the 21st-century town meetings convened by AmericaSpeaks, among others. In these cases, deliberative democracy is not connected to left-wing politics but is intended to create a conversation among people of different philosophies and beliefs.

In Canada, there have been two prominent applications of deliberative democratic models. In 2004, the British Columbia Citizens' Assembly on Electoral Reform convened a policy jury to consider alternatives to the first-past-the-post electoral systems. In 2007, the Ontario Citizens' Assembly on Electoral Reform convened to consider alternative electoral systems in that province.  Similarly, three of Ontario's Local Health Integration Networks (LHIN) have referred their budget priorities to a policy jury for advice and refinement.

The Green Party of the United States refers to its particular proposals for grassroots democracy and electoral reform by this name. Although not always the case,  participation in deliberation has often been found to shift participants opinions in favour of Green positions, and can even cause a favourable change of voting intention. For example, with Europolis 2009, at the time one of the largest deliberative assemblies ever held, which set out to assess the public's view on a wide range of issues and included representatives from all 27 EU member nations, the share of citizens intending to vote for the Greens increased from 8% to 18%.

Academic contributors
According to Professor Stephen Tierney, perhaps the earliest notable example of academic interest in the deliberative aspects of democracy occurred in John Rawls 1971 work A Theory of Justice.

Joseph M. Bessette coined the term "deliberative democracy" in his 1980 work "Deliberative Democracy: The Majority Principle in Republican Government", and went on to elaborate and defend the notion in "The Mild Voice of Reason" (1994). Others contributing to the notion of deliberative democracy include Carlos Nino, Jon Elster, Roberto Gargarella, John Gastil, Jürgen Habermas, David Held, Joshua Cohen, John Rawls, Amy Gutmann, Noëlle McAfee, John Dryzek, Rense Bos, James S. Fishkin, Jane Mansbridge, Jose Luis Marti, Dennis Thompson, Benny Hjern, Hal Koch, Seyla Benhabib, Ethan Leib, Charles Sabel, Jeffrey K. Tulis, David Estlund, Mariah Zeisberg, Jeffrey L. McNairn, Iris Marion Young and Robert B. Talisse.

Although political theorists took the lead in the study of deliberative democracy, political scientists have in recent years begun to investigate its processes. One of the main challenges currently is to discover more about the actual conditions under which the ideals of deliberative democracy are more or less likely to be realized.

Most recently, scholarship has focused on the emergence of a 'systemic approach' to the study of deliberation.  This suggests that the deliberative capacity of a democratic system needs to be understood through the interconnection of the variety of sites of deliberation which exist, rather than any single setting. Some studies have conducted experiments to examine how deliberative democracy addresses the problems of sustainability and underrepresentation of future generations.

See also

Organizations:
AmericaSpeaks
Concepts:
Anticipatory exclusion
Citizen oversight
Deliberation
Deliberative assembly
Deliberative opinion poll
Deliberative referendum
Mediated deliberation
Experiments In Deliberative Democracy
Citizens' Assembly (Ireland)
Democracy
Agonistic democracy
Consensus democracy
Collaborative e-democracy
Demarchy
Direct democracy
Liquid democracy
Participatory democracy
Representative democracy
Group decision making
Consensus decision-making
Majority rule
Meritocracy
Online deliberation
Open source governance
The People's Parliament
Citizens' assembly
Public reason
Public sphere
Ralph Nader's Concord Principles
Royal commission

Notes and citations

References

Bessette, Joseph (1980) "Deliberative Democracy: The Majority Principle in Republican Government," in How Democratic is the Constitution?, Washington, D.C., AEI Press. pp. 102–116.
Bessette, Joseph, (1994) The Mild Voice of Reason: Deliberative Democracy & American National Government Chicago: University of Chicago Press.
Blattberg, C. (2003) "Patriotic, Not Deliberative, Democracy" Critical Review of International Social and Political Philosophy 6, no. 1, pp. 155–74. Reprinted as ch. 2 of Blattberg, C. (2009) Patriotic Elaborations: Essays in Practical Philosophy. Montreal and Kingston: McGill-Queen's University Press.
 
Cohen, J. (1989) "Deliberative Democracy and Democratic Legitimacy" (Hamlin, A. and Pettit, P. eds.), The Good Polity. Oxford: Blackwell. pp. 17–34
Cohen, J. (1997) "Deliberation and Democratic Legitimacy" (James Bohman & William Rehg eds.) Deliberative Democracy: Essays on Reason and Politics (Bohman, J. and Rehg, W. eds.).
 
 
 
Fishkin, James & Peter Laslett, eds. (2003). Debating Deliberative Democracy. Wiley-Blackwell. 
 
Gutmann, Amy and Dennis Thompson (1996). Democracy and Disagreement. Princeton University Press. 
Gutmann, Amy and Dennis Thompson (2002). Why Deliberative Democracy? Princeton University Press. 
Leib, Ethan J. "Can Direct Democracy Be Made Deliberative?", Buffalo Law Review, Vol. 54, 2006
 
 
 Owen, D. and Smith, G. (2015). "Survey article: Deliberation, democracy, and the systemic turn." Journal of Political Philosophy 23.2: 213-234
Painter, Kimberly, (2013) "Deliberative Democracy in Action: Exploring the 2012 City of Austin Bond Development Process" Applied Research Project Texas State University.
 
 
Steenhuis, Quinten. (2004) "The Deliberative Opinion Poll: Promises and Challenges". Carnegie Mellon University. Unpublished thesis. Available Online 
Talisse, Robert, (2004) Democracy after Liberalism Publisher: Routledge 
Thompson, Dennis F (2008). "Deliberative Democratic Theory and Empirical Political Science," Annual Review of Political Science 11: 497-520. 
Tulis, Jeffrey K., (1988) The Rhetorical Presidency Publisher: Princeton University Press
Tulis, Jeffrey K., (2003) "Deliberation Between Institutions," in Debating Deliberative Democracy, eds. James Fishkin and Peter Laslett. Wiley-Blackwell. 
Uhr, J. (1998) Deliberative Democracy in Australia: The Changing Place of Parliament'', Cambridge: Cambridge University Press

External links
Centre for Deliberative Democracy and Global Governance, University of Canberra, the world leading center in the growing field of deliberative democracy
OpenForum.com.au, an online collaborative think tank, which invites people from all walks of life to engage with the political process, by participating directly in policy debates with politicians, business people, academics, senior public servants, and other interested parties.
National Issues Forums
Center for Deliberative Democracy, Stanford University
Deliberative Democracy Consortium — A movement to promote Deliberative Democracy at the national level, internationally
The National Coalition for Dialogue and Deliberation — A hub for this growing community of practice, with hundreds of members and thousands of resources
AmericaSpeaks official website, creators of the 21st Century Town Meeting
Alternative Demokratie Deliberative democracy in Germany transl. in engl.
MASS LBP official website
BC Citizens' Assembly on Electoral Reform website
Ontario Citizens' Assembly on Electoral Reform website
Closing the Gap in Deliberative Democracy: The Importance of Communication in the Post-Deliberative Process
Journal of Public Deliberation synthesizes the research, opinion, projects, experiments and experiences of academics and practitioners in the emerging multi-disciplinary field and political movement.
Citizens' Initiative Review process in several U.S. states (unofficial)

Direct democracy
Political theories
Deliberative groups
Group decision-making
Communication
Participatory democracy
Types of democracy